

544001–544100 

|-id=033
| 544033 Lihsing ||  || Li Hsing (1930–2021) was a Taiwanese film director. || 
|}

544101–544200 

|-bgcolor=#f2f2f2
| colspan=4 align=center | 
|}

544201–544300 

|-bgcolor=#f2f2f2
| colspan=4 align=center | 
|}

544301–544400 

|-id=325
| 544325 Péczbéla ||  || Béla Pécz (born 1961), a Hungarian physicist and material scientist, who introduced aberration-corrected electron microscopy in Hungary and contributed to the development of devices based on gallium nitride and thin films using indium nitride. || 
|}

544401–544500 

|-bgcolor=#f2f2f2
| colspan=4 align=center | 
|}

544501–544600 

|-id=541
| 544541 Srholec ||  || Anton Srholec (1929–2016) was a Slovak Roman Catholic priest and Salesian. || 
|}

544601–544700 

|-id=618
| 544618 Bugátpál ||  ||  (1793–1865) was a Hungargian physician, university professor, and a language reformer. || 
|}

544701–544800 

|-bgcolor=#f2f2f2
| colspan=4 align=center | 
|}

544801–544900 

|-bgcolor=#f2f2f2
| colspan=4 align=center | 
|}

544901–545000 

|-bgcolor=#f2f2f2
| colspan=4 align=center | 
|}

References 

544001-545000